The 2018–19 Notre Dame Fighting Irish men's basketball team represented the University of Notre Dame during the 2018–19 NCAA Division I men's basketball season. The Fighting Irish, led by 19th-year head coach Mike Brey, played their home games at Edmund P. Joyce Center in South Bend, Indiana as sixth-year members of the Atlantic Coast Conference.

Previous season
The Fighting Irish finished the 2017–18 season 21–15, 8–10 in ACC play to finish tied with Syracuse for tenth place. As the No. 10 seed in the ACC tournament, they defeated Pittsburgh in the first round and Virginia Tech in the second round before losing to Duke in the quarterfinals. They were one of the last four teams not selected for the NCAA tournament and as a result earned a No. 1 seed in the National Invitation Tournament, where they defeated Hampton in the first round before losing to Penn State in the second round.

Offseason

Departures

2018 recruiting class

Roster

Schedule and results

Source:

|-
!colspan=12 style=|Exhibition

|-
!colspan=12 style=| Non-conference regular season

|-
!colspan=12 style=| ACC regular season

|-
!colspan=12 style=| ACC tournament

Rankings

*AP does not release post-NCAA Tournament rankings

References

Notre Dame Fighting Irish men's basketball seasons
Notre Dame
Notre Dame Fighting Irish men's basketball
Notre Dame Fighting Irish men's basketball